The 2019 season was Western Storm's fourth season, in which they competed in the final edition of the Women's Cricket Super League, a Twenty20 competition. The side finished top of the initial group stage, winning 9 of their 10 matches, therefore progressing straight to the final. In the final they played against Southern Vipers, beating them by seven wickets to claim their second Super League title.

The side was captained by Heather Knight and coached by Trevor Griffin. They played three home matches at the County Ground, Taunton and two at the County Ground, Bristol.

Squad
Western Storm announced their full 15-player squad for the season on 5 July 2019. Age given is at the start of Western Storm's first match of the season (6 August 2019).

Women's Cricket Super League

Season standings

 Advanced to the Final.
 Advanced to the Semi-final.

League stage

Final

Statistics

Batting

Bowling

Fielding

Wicket-keeping

References

Western Storm seasons
2019 in English women's cricket